The 1990 Scotland rugby union tour of New Zealand involved eight rugby union matches played between 30 May and 23 June by the Scotland national rugby union team in New Zealand. It was the third tour of New Zealand by Scotland who won five matches and drew one, but lost the two  test matches against the All Blacks. This was the first time that a Scotland team had been unbeaten, international matches excepted, in a Southern Hemisphere tour.

Matches 
Scores and results list Scotland's points tally first.

Touring party

Manager: D. S. Paterson
Coach: Ian McGeechan
Assistant coach: Derrick Grant
Captain: David Sole

Backs

Peter Dods
Gavin Hastings
Alex Moore
Stewart Porter
Tony Stanger
Iwan Tukalo
Scott Hastings
Sean Lineen
Craig Redpath
Graham Shiel
Craig Chalmers
Douglas Wyllie
Gary Armstrong
Greig Oliver

Forwards

Derek White
Alex Brewster
Paul Burnell
Iain Milne
David Sole
John Allan
Kenny Milne
Damian Cronin
Chris Gray
Jeremy Richardson
Doddie Weir
George Buchanan-Smith
Finlay Calder
John Jeffrey
Derek Turnbull
Graham Marshall

See also
 History of rugby union matches between New Zealand and Scotland

References

Scotland rugby union tour
Scotland national rugby union team tours
Rugby union tours of New Zealand
Scottish-New Zealand culture
tour
tour